Cornelius Tre' Stallings (born January 8, 1983) is a former American football guard. He was drafted by the Kansas City Chiefs in the sixth round of the 2006 NFL Draft. He played college football at Mississippi.

External links
Baltimore Ravens bio
Kansas City Chiefs bio

1983 births
Living people
People from Magnolia, Mississippi
Players of American football from Mississippi
American football offensive tackles
American football offensive guards
Ole Miss Rebels football players
Kansas City Chiefs players
Amsterdam Admirals players
Baltimore Ravens players